Francis Connors may refer to:

Francis Lawrence Connors (1891–1964), also known as Frank Connors, pharmacist and politician in Quebec, Canada
Frank Connors (1888–1963), Australian politician and trade unionist

See also
Francis Connor (disambiguation)